Moriah Jefferson (born March 8, 1994) is an American professional basketball player for the Phoenix Mercury in the Women's National Basketball Association (WNBA). She was drafted second overall by the San Antonio Stars in the 2016 WNBA draft. Jefferson played point guard for UConn women's basketball team, where she won four consecutive national championships. She finished her UConn career ranked first in assists, second in steals, and as a two-time winner of the Nancy Lieberman Award as the top point guard in the nation. On May 16, 2019, Jefferson was traded to the Dallas Wings.

Early life
Jefferson is the daughter of Robin and Lorenza Jefferson. She has two brothers, Joshua and Jeremiah, and one sister, Danielle Noble.

High School career
Jefferson played five varsity seasons with the Texas Home Educators Sports Association (THESA) Riders as a homeschooled athlete. Jefferson began playing with THESA's varsity squad as an eighth grader and compiled 509 points, 85 rebounds, and 87 assists. In her freshman year, she started in 50 of 51 games played and averaged 19.5 points, 1.7 rebounds, 1.7 assists. and 2.8 steals per game to help THESA to a 42–10 record. As a sophomore, Jefferson averaged 17.5 points to help her team to a 42–9 record. During her junior year, she started all 50 games and averaged 21.8 points, 5.0 rebounds, 4.0 assists, and 4.0 steals per game in aiding her team to a 42–8 record. As a senior, she averaged 17.3 points, 3.8 rebounds, 3.6 assists, and 5.1 steals per game to lead her team to a 41–6 record. Jefferson helped lead the Riders to five National Christian Homeschool Basketball Championships (NCHBC) titles and five NCHBC Texas Region titles and finished her career with 3,354 points, 825 rebounds, and 728 steals.

Jefferson was selected to the 2012 WBCA High School Coaches' All-America Team. She participated in the 2012 WBCA High School All-America Game, scoring four points.

Jefferson was recruited by many schools; she visited Baylor, Connecticut, Oklahoma, Texas and Texas A&M, and was also considering Kentucky and Tennessee before cutting her list down to Baylor, Connecticut and Texas A&M. She ended up choosing Connecticut. She is the first recruit from the state of Texas to play for UConn.

USA Basketball
Jefferson was named to the USA Basketball U18 team, coached by Katie Meier, the head coach of the University of Miami. Among Jefferson's teammates were Connecticut-bound players Breanna Stewart and Morgan Tuck. The team played in the Ninth Women's FIBA Americas U18 Championship For Women, held in Gurabo, Puerto Rico during August 2012. The USA team won all five games to win the championship and the gold medal. After winning the first four easily, with winning margins of 40 points or more, USA fell behind by double digits in the gold medal game against Brazil. The team came back from the deficit, and went on to win the game 71–47.

Jefferson continued with the team as it became the U19 team, and competed on behalf of the US at the FIBA U19 World Championship, held in Klaipėda and Panevėžys, Lithuania, in July 2013. The team won all nine games, with an average winning margin of 43 points per game. Jefferson scored 4.0 points per game, and was third on her team with 31 assists over the course of the event.

Jefferson was a member of the USA Women's Pan American Team which participated in basketball at the 2015 Pan American Games held in Toronto from July 10–26, 2015.

College

University of Connecticut

Jefferson led UConn to a 151–5 record over her four-year career, which included four consecutive National Championships. She finished her career in 22nd place on the UConn scoring list with 1,532, all-time leader in assists with 659, and second in steals with 353. Her 195 assists in 2013–14 is the fifth-highest single-season mark in school history, while her 191 assists in 2014–15 is the sixth-best single-season total. She became the second player in UConn history to dish out 200 assists. She became only the second Husky all-time to record back-to-back years with at least 100 steals. Jefferson's 191 assists during the 2014–15 season were the most by a UConn junior, while her 204 assists in 2015–16 is the best single-season total. Jefferson was named the 2014–2015 American Athletic Conference and WBCA NCAA Division I Defensive Player of the Year, and Consensus first team All-American for the second straight season. Jefferson is the third UConn player to earn the Nancy Lieberman Award (nation's top point guard) and one of only four players in the award's history to claim the honor twice.

College statistics
The following statistics represent Jefferson's collegiate career at the University of Connecticut.

Professional career

WNBA
After being drafted second overall by the San Antonio Stars in the 2016 WNBA Draft, Jefferson immediately became a starter on the team. During her rookie season, Jefferson scored a game-winning putback to beat the buzzer as part of her career-high 31 points to help San Antonio defeat the Indiana Fever 87–85 in overtime on July 1, 2016. She was named to the WNBA All-Rookie Team by the end of the season. She missed 13 games during the 2017 season due to a knee injury. On September 27, 2017, she had a surgery to fix the cartilage in her right knee. After rehabilitating for nine months, and missing the first 17 games of the 2018 season, she returned to practice on June 21, 2018. She was traded to the Dallas Wings before the 2019 season but chose to sit the season out to rehab. She made her debut for the Wings during the 2020 season but, she suffered another season ending injury to her right knee.

On May 9 2022, Jefferson was waived by the Wings. Four days later, on May 13, Jefferson joined the Minnesota Lynx.

Turkey
In August 2016, Jefferson signed with Galatasaray of the Turkish Women's Basketball League (KBSL) for the 2016–17 season. For the season, she averaged 18.5 points and 4.9 assists, and helped it reach the KBSL semi-finals. She returned to Galatasaray for the 2018–19 season where she averaged 13.4 points and once again helped the team to the semi-finals.

Endorsements
In September 2016, Jefferson was featured in the Adidas "Sport Needs Creators" ad alongside athletes including Von Miller of the Denver Broncos, Paul Pogba of Manchester United, and James Harden of the Houston Rockets.

WNBA career statistics

Regular season

|-
| align="left" | 2016
| align="left" | San Antonio
| 34 || 34 || 30.4 || .426 || .375 || .775 || 2.1 || 4.2 || 1.6 || 0.1 || 1.7 || 13.9
|-
| align="left" | 2017
| align="left" | San Antonio
| 21 || 9 || 24.5 || .523 || .450 || .741 || 1.8 || 4.4 || 1.5 || 0.1 || 2.0 || 9.1
|-
| align="left" | 2018
| align="left" | Las Vegas
| 16 || 0 || 15.7 || .379 || .200 || .810 || 1.3 || 2.1 || 0.6 || 0.0 || 1.0 || 5.4
|-
| align="left" | 2020
| align="left" | Dallas
| 9 || 6 || 16.4 || .409 || .333 || .583 || 3.1 || 2.0 || 0.8 || 0.2 || 1.7 || 5.0
|-
| align="left" | 2021
| align="left" | Dallas
| 29 || 28 || 17.2 || .449 || .460 || .600 || 2.0 || 2.5 || 0.8 || 0.2 || 1.4 || 5.4
|-
| align="left" | 2022
| align="left" | Dallas
| 1 || 0 || 4.0 || .000 || .000 || .000 || 0.0 || 0.0 || 0.0 || 0.0 || 0.0 || 0.0
|-
| align="left" | 2022
| align="left" | Minnesota
| 30 || 30 || 26.8 || .452 || .474 || .815 || 2.5 || 4.9 || 1.2 || 0.1 || 2.2 || 10.8
|-
| align="left" | Career
| align="left" | 6 years, 3 teams
| 140 || 107 || 23.3 || .444 || .416 || .772 || 2.1 || 3.6 || 1.2 || 0.1 || 1.7 || 9.1

Playoffs

|-
| style="text-align:left;"| 2021
| style="text-align:left;"| Dallas
| 1 || 1 || 25.0 || .571 || .333 || .000 || 2.0 || 4.0 || 2.0 || 0.0 || 4.0 || 9.0
|-
| style="text-align:left;"| Career
| style="text-align:left;"| 1 year, 1 team
| 1 || 1 || 25.0 || .571 || .333 || .000 || 2.0 || 4.0 || 2.0 || 0.0 || 4.0 || 9.0

Awards and honors
 2012—WBCA High School Coaches' All-America Team
 2014—AP All-American Honorable Mention 
 2015—WBCA All-America Team
 2015—Nancy Lieberman Award
 2016—Nancy Lieberman Award
 2016—Dawn Staley Award

References

1994 births
Living people
All-American college women's basketball players
American women's basketball players
Basketball players at the 2015 Pan American Games
Basketball players from Dallas
Dallas Wings players
Las Vegas Aces players
McDonald's High School All-Americans
Medalists at the 2015 Pan American Games
Minnesota Lynx players
Pan American Games medalists in basketball
Pan American Games silver medalists for the United States
Parade High School All-Americans (girls' basketball)
Point guards
San Antonio Stars draft picks
San Antonio Stars players
UConn Huskies women's basketball players
United States women's national basketball team players